Popple Creek is an unincorporated community in Mayhew Lake Township, Benton County, Minnesota, United States.  The community is located near the junction of Benton County Roads 3 and 4.  Nearby places include Sauk Rapids and Foley.

References

Unincorporated communities in Benton County, Minnesota
Unincorporated communities in Minnesota